Livia Väresmaa (born 14 July 1975) is a Finnish sailor. She competed in the Yngling event at the 2008 Summer Olympics.

References

External links
 

1975 births
Living people
Finnish female sailors (sport)
Olympic sailors of Finland
Sailors at the 2008 Summer Olympics – Yngling
Sportspeople from Helsinki